Aasmäe is an Estonian surname. Notable people with the surname include:
Hardo Aasmäe (1951–2014), Estonian politician and geographer
Mari-Liis Aasmäe (:et), Estonian pop-musician
Meelis Aasmäe (born 1972), Estonian cross-country skier
 (born 1947), Estonian linguist

See also
Ääsmäe, settlement in Saue Parish, Harju County, Estonia

Estonian-language surnames